Epithelantha bokei is a species of cactus known by the common names pingpong ball cactus and button-cactus. It is native to Texas in the United States and Coahuila in Mexico.

This cactus is disc-shaped or cylindrical and usually unbranched. It has a flat top. It usually measures 2 to 5 centimeters in width. It is so thickly covered in pale-colored spines that it is white or yellowish in color. There are up to 90 on each areole. The longest are about 7 millimeters in length. The delicate pale pink flowers are up to 1.7 centimeters long and wide. The red fruit is about a centimeter long. Much of the plant is located below ground, with a few centimeters above. It contracts into the ground during dry periods.

This cactus grows on rocky or gravelly limestone substrates. Threats to the species include poaching and habitat degradation. It is in cultivation at the Desert Botanical Garden in Phoenix, Arizona.

The specific epithet honors Norman H. Boke, plant anatomist and student of the Cactaceae.

References

External links
USDA Plants Profile

Cactoideae
Flora of Texas
Flora of Coahuila